Sheeley Mountain is a mountain in the Adirondack Mountains region of New York. It is located northwest of the Hamlet of Caroga Lake. Kane Mountain is located north-northwest, Canada Lake is located north and West Caroga Lake is located south-southeast of Sheeley Mountain.

References

Mountains of Fulton County, New York
Mountains of New York (state)